Jakob Olsson (born March 7, 1997) is a Swedish ice hockey player. He is currently playing with Frölunda HC of the Swedish Hockey League (SHL).

Olsson made his Swedish Hockey League debut playing with Frölunda HC during the 2014–15 SHL season.

References

External links

1997 births
Frölunda HC players
Living people
Swedish ice hockey left wingers
People from Lerum Municipality
Sportspeople from Västra Götaland County